Maria Lisa Cinciari Rodano (born 21 January 1921) is an Italian former politician. She served as a member of the Italian Parliament's lower and upper house, and as a member of the European Parliament for Central Italy. In 2021, Rodano became a centenarian.

References 

1921 births
Living people
Politicians from Rome
Members of the Chamber of Deputies (Italy)
Members of the Senate of the Republic (Italy)
Italian centenarians
Women centenarians
20th-century Italian women politicians
20th-century women MEPs for Italy
20th-century Italian women
21st-century Italian women
Italian Communist Party politicians
Democratic Party of the Left politicians
Democrats of the Left politicians
MEPs for Italy 1979–1984
MEPs for Italy 1984–1989
Women members of the Chamber of Deputies (Italy)
Women members of the Senate of the Republic (Italy)